Ryohei Arai may refer to:

, Japanese film director
, Japanese footballer
, Japanese javelin thrower
, Japanese voice actor